Actinic granuloma is a cutaneous condition characterized histologically by a dermal infiltrate of macrophages.

Actinic granuloma is an asymptomatic granulomatous reaction that affects sun-exposed skin, most commonly on the face, neck, and scalp. 
It is characterized by annular or polycyclic lesions that slowly expand centrifugally and have an erythematous elevated edge and a hypopigmented, atrophic center. 
Advise to reduce exposure to the sun and to use sunscreen. 
Treatment with topical halometasone cream, pimecrolimus cream.

See also 
 Annular elastolytic giant cell granuloma
 Skin lesion
 List of cutaneous conditions

References

External links 

Monocyte- and macrophage-related cutaneous conditions